Hermitage Mona Lisa is a painting on canvas, which was made by unknown painter in the mid-16th century and it is located in Hermitage Museum of Saint Peterburg. It was transferred from the Antikvariat All-Union Association and entered the Hermitage in 1931.

Description
This portrait is an image of Lisa Gherardini, best known as Mona Lisa or Gioconda, and is a blatant copy of the original Gioconda. Although it is very different from the authentic Mona Lisa of the Louvre in Paris, the good workmanship, legibility and expressiveness emanating from the work have been pointed out. The execution of the portrait is presumably of Nordic Europe derivation, in particular German-Flemish. The face of the model is different, being younger than the version of Leonardo da Vinci, but also the rear panorama presents two columns, which are absent in the original. Many people call this picture Gioconda with columns. Two columns are found in other copies such as Gioconda of Oslo in National Museum of Art, Architecture and Design, Gioconda of Baltimore in Walters Art Museum and Gioconda of Reynolds in Dulwich Picture Gallery.

Analysis
Scientific analysis was carried out on the canvas and baryte, called barium sulphate in chemistry, was found. It is a mineral used for the preparation of the support, especially in the years ranging from 1620 to 1680, but when this substance was used, Leonardo had been dead for more than a century.

See also
Mona Lisa (Prado)
Isleworth Mona Lisa
Gioconda Torlonia
Two-Mona Lisa theory
Mona Lisa replicas and reinterpretations

Notes 

Mona Lisa